The 2002 Karachi bus bombing was one of a series of deadly strikes on Westerners in Pakistan in 2002. The blast killed 14 people and wounded another 40. The attack took place in Karachi, Sindh.

Details 
On May 8, 2002, a man driving a car bomb stopped next to a bus in Karachi outside the Sheraton Hotel. He detonated the car, ripping the bus apart, and killing himself, 11 Frenchmen, and two Pakistanis. The Frenchmen were engineers working with Pakistan to design an Agosta 90B-class submarine for the Pakistani Navy. About 40 others were wounded.

The bombing occurred close to the Pearl-Continental Hotel where the New Zealand national cricket team were staying as part of their tour of 2002. The team's physiotherapist Dayle Shackel received a minor cut to his forearm from flying glass. The tour was abandoned immediately with the team returning to New Zealand on the first available flight.

Al-Qaeda was blamed for the blast. On September 18, 2002, a man named Sharib Zubair, who was believed to have masterminded the attack, was arrested. In 2003, two men were sentenced to death for the bombing by a Karachi court. The suspected bombmaker, Mufti Mohammad Sabir, was arrested in Karachi on September 8, 2005. There were several convictions in the case, though Pakistani courts acquitted three defendants by 2009.

Karachigate

Contrary to official announcements by the Pakistani and the French governments at the time, it is now thought to be unlikely that those responsible for the attack had links to al-Qaeda. In 2007, anti-terrorism judge Jean-Louis Bruguiere, assigned to lead the investigation into the bombing, was replaced by two investigating magistrates, Marc Trevidic and Renaud Van Ruymbeke. The former opened a new line in the investigation: that the attack was linked to the halting of kickback. The resulting scandal has been dubbed "Karachigate".

An investigation is currently underway in France to establish the extent to which former French Prime Minister Édouard Balladur and former French President Nicolas Sarkozy were implicated in the sale of kickbacks to Pakistani officials. Sarkozy was allegedly involved in accepting kickbacks from Pakistan to fund the presidential campaign of Balladur. When Jacques Chirac came to power, he cancelled the Pakistani officials' kickbacks, angering many people in Pakistan.

See also
 Karachi affair
 2009 attack on the Sri Lanka national cricket team

References

External links
Suicide bomber kills 11 French engineers at Karachi hotel (The Guardian)
Timeline: The Karachi bombing and kickback allegations France 24.

2002 murders in Pakistan
2002 in international relations
2002 bus bombing
21st-century mass murder in Pakistan
Bus bombings in Asia
France–Pakistan relations
French terrorism victims
Mass murder in 2002
2002 bus bombing
May 2002 crimes
May 2002 events in Asia
Suicide bombings in 2002
2002 bus bombing
Suicide car and truck bombings in Pakistan
Terrorist incidents in Pakistan in 2002